Snow Hill is an unincorporated community in Clinton County, in the U.S. state of Ohio.

History
Snow Hill was laid out and platted in 1817. A post office called Snow Hill was established in 1823, and remained in operation until 1865.

References

Unincorporated communities in Clinton County, Ohio
Unincorporated communities in Ohio